Donna Vekić (born 28 June 1996) is a Croatian professional tennis player and businesswoman. In November 2019, she achieved a career-high singles ranking of world No. 19. She has won four singles titles on the WTA Tour – at the 2014 Malaysian Open, at the 2017 Nottingham Open, the 2021 Courmayeur Ladies Open, and the 2023 Monterrey Open. She has also won five singles titles and one doubles title on the ITF Circuit. Her best performances at a Major singles event was reaching the quarterfinals of both the 2019 US Open and the 2023 Australian Open.

Professional career

2012: First WTA Tour final

Born in Osijek, Vekić is a member of the Croatia Fed Cup team. In February 2012, she played three rubbers at the tournament, including helping her country to a 2–0 win over Bosnia and Herzegovina.

At the Tashkent Open, Vekić made it to her first final on the WTA Tour. It was her first main-draw appearance there, and she was the youngest player in six years to make it to the final of such an event. However, she was defeated by Irina-Camelia Begu in straight sets.

2013: Top 100 debut
Vekić started her year off by entering the main draw of the Australian Open and defeated Andrea Hlaváčková in the first round. In the second, she fell to the tenth seed and former world No. 1, Caroline Wozniacki, in straight sets.

Vekić qualified (seeded 16th) for the main draw of the Miami Open by defeating Marta Sirotkina and Valeria Savinykh. In the first round, she beat fellow qualifier Yulia Putintseva. In the second, she lost to 29th seed Elena Vesnina. At the Monterrey Open, she defeated Julia Cohen in the first round. In the second round, she lost to seventh seed Urszula Radwańska. Vekić won the $50k tournament in Istanbul, defeating Elizaveta Kulichkova in the final. Vekic ended the 2013 season ranked No. 86, her first top-100 season.

2014: First WTA title

Vekić began 2014 season at the Shenzhen Open where she lost in the first round to third seed Klára Zakopalová. At the Australian Open, she was defeated in the first round by qualifier Lucie Hradecká.

In Thailand at the Pattaya Open, she lost in the first round to top seed Sabine Lisicki. At the Brasil Tennis Cup, Vekić was defeated in the first round by third seed and eventual champion, Klára Zakopalová. In March, she was awarded a wildcard for the Indian Wells Open where she lost in the second round to 12th seed Dominika Cibulková. At the Miami Open in Key Biscayne, Vekić came through qualifying with wins over Alla Kudryavtseva and Johanna Larsson. In the main draw, she upset 28th seed Svetlana Kuznetsova in the second round. She was defeated in the third round by eighth seed Petra Kvitová. At the Monterrey Open, Vekić beat fifth seed Garbiñe Muguruza in the first round in two tie-breaking sets, but lost to Karolína Plíšková in the second round, in three sets. Seeded seventh at the Malaysian Open, Vekić won her first career WTA tournament title by defeating top seed Dominika Cibulková in the final.

At the Madrid Open, Vekić was defeated in the final round of qualifying by Kristina Mladenovic. At the French Open in Roland-Garros, she lost in the first round to Julia Glushko.

Vekić played one grass-court tournament before Wimbledon, at the Birmingham Classic where she was defeated in the first round by Belinda Bencic. At the Wimbledon Championships, Vekić stunned 21st seed Roberta Vinci in the first round. She lost in the second round to 2010 Wimbledon finalist Vera Zvonareva.

At the İstanbul Cup, Vekić was defeated in the first round by third seed Klára Koukalová. At the Baku Cup, she lost in the second round to Kristina Mladenovic.

Vekić started US Open Series at the Rogers Cup where she was eliminated in the first round of qualifying by Tamira Paszek. At the Cincinnati Open, she lost in the first round of qualifying to Monica Niculescu. At the Connecticut Open, she was defeated in the first round of qualifying by Belinda Bencic. In Flushing Meadows, she lost in the first round to Coco Vandeweghe.

Seeded fifth at the Tashkent Open, Vekić was defeated in the second round by Urszula Radwańska. At the Korea Open, she lost in the first round to Maria Kirilenko. After qualifying for the first edition of the Wuhan Open, Vekić was defeated in the first round by 16th seed Andrea Petkovic.

2015: Fourth WTA final

Vekić began the year as world No. 81. After a bad start into the new season, she beat Louisa Chirico at Indian Wells but lost in the second round to Zarina Diyas. After her ranking dropped to No. 177, she entered the Lale Cup in Istanbul as the top seed but lost in the quarterfinals to the sixth seed, Margarita Gasparyan. She lost in the first round of the Marrakesh Grand Prix, and in the second round of the Madrid Open.

During the French Open, she claimed her first top-40 victory in the season when she beat Caroline Garcia, and also defeated Bojana Jovanovski before bowing out to Ana Ivanovic. After the French Open she continued her bad form from the first half of the season by failing to qualify for Wimbledon or the US Open. In Tashkent, she reached the final with three-set wins over Kiki Bertens, Carina Witthöft and Anna-Lena Friedsam and a two-set victory over Evgeniya Rodina, but lost to Nao Hibino. She ended the season ranked No. 105.

2016: Fifth ITF title

Vekić began the season ranked 103. At the Australian Open, she lost in the first round to qualifier Naomi Osaka. She reached the quarterfinals of the San Antonio Open, with wins over Aliaksandra Sasnovich and Kiki Bertens, before losing to Tsvetana Pironkova. She lost in the first round of ten consecutive WTA tournaments from February to August, including the French Open, where she lost to Madison Keys, and Wimbledon, where she took Venus Williams to a first-set tie-break but lost in straight sets.

At Cincinnati in August, Vekić had victories over Varvara Lepchenko and Mariana Duque-Marino in qualifying, and defeated world No. 25 Ana Ivanovic, in the first round, before losing to tenth seed Johanna Konta in the second round. She failed to progress through qualifying for the US Open. In September, she reached the final of the ITF Saint Petersburg, with wins over Olga Doroshina, Anastasiya Komardina, Vesna Dolonc and Aryna Sabalenka, before losing the final to Natalia Vikhlyantseva, in straight sets. In Tashkent, she lost in the first round to Kateryna Kozlova. In Tianjin, after her victory over Zhang Kailin, she lost to the second seed, Svetlana Kuznetsova.

In October, at the Soho Square Tournament, she had victories over Laura Pigossi, Jaqueline Cristian (walkover) and Arantxa Rus, before she beat Maria Sakkari in three sets in the semifinals to reach her second ITF final of the year. In the final, she defeated Sara Sorribes Tormo in three sets, to win the fifth ITF title of her career. In Poitiers, she lost in the first round to Lauren Davis, while at the Open de Limoges she reached the third round, where she lost in three sets to world No. 24 and top-seed, Caroline Garcia. Vekić ended the season ranked world No. 101.

2017: Second WTA title
She reached the second round at the Australian Open and then lost to Caroline Wozniacki. Vekić won her second WTA Tour title at the Nottingham Open in June, defeating Johanna Konta in three sets. Two weeks later, in the second round of the Wimbledon Championships, she lost to Konta in three sets, with the final set lasting eighteen games. At the US Open, she reached the third round of a Grand Slam tournament for the first time since the 2015 French Open, easily losing to Anastasija Sevastova. Vekić broke into the top 50 for the first time in July, reached a career-high singles ranking of No. 45 on 25 September, and ended the season ranked No. 56.

2018: Continued success, top 50 year-end ranking

At the 2018 Wimbledon Championships, Vekić reached the fourth round in a Grand Slam for the first time in her career. She upset world No. 4, Sloane Stephens, in the first round, then beat Rebecca Peterson and Yanina Wickmayer in straight sets before losing to eventual semi-finalist Julia Görges. Following Wimbledon, she made the final at the Washington Open; however, she lost to Svetlana Kuznetsova in three sets, after squandering four match points in the second set. In September, Vekić reached the semifinals in Tokyo by defeating top-10 players Sloane Stephens and Caroline Garcia. She ended the season ranked 34, her first year-end top 50 rankings.

2019: First Grand Slam quarterfinal, consistent results, top 20 year-end ranking
Vekić started the year strong by reaching the semifinals in Brisbane, but was unable to keep this momentum at the Australian Open, being upset in the second round by the Australian wildcard and world No. 240, Kimberly Birrell. She rebounded at her next tournament, reaching the biggest final of her career at the St. Petersburg Trophy, a Premier-level event. Along the way, she upset the defending champion, world No. 2 and Australian Open runner-up, Petra Kvitová, in the quarterfinals, her first career win over the Czech. In the final, she was beaten by world No. 8, Kiki Bertens, in two close sets. She then reached another semifinal in Acapulco, losing to eventual champion Wang Yafan, before recording early round exits in both Indian Wells and Miami.

Vekić only played two clay-court warm-up tournaments, losing in the quarterfinals to world No. 1, Naomi Osaka, in Stuttgart and retiring in her third-round match against fellow Croatian Petra Martić in Madrid due to a foot injury.

Seeded 23rd at the French Open, Vekić advanced to the fourth round for the first time in her career, after upsetting world No. 15, Belinda Bencic, in the third round. She then lost to Johanna Konta, in straight sets.

Opening the grass-court season in Nottingham, Vekić reached her second final of the year before falling to former world No. 4, Caroline Garcia, despite leading by a set and a break. After an opening-round loss to French Open champion Ashleigh Barty in Birmingham, Vekić was tabbed as a potential dark horse in the ladies' singles draw at Wimbledon. However, she was upset in three sets in her first round match by eventual quarterfinalist, American Alison Riske.

Rebounding from this disappointment, Vekić opened the summer hardcourt season with a semifinal showing in San Jose before making the third round in Cincinnati, where she fell to Venus Williams. Seeded 23rd at the US Open, Vekić defeated Richèl Hogenkamp, Kaia Kanepi, Yulia Putintseva and 26th seed Julia Görges to advance to her first Grand Slam quarterfinal, becoming the first Croatian woman to reach the last eight at the US Open since Ana Konjuh in 2016. There, she was beaten by the 13th seed Bencic, in straight sets.

Despite recording just two match wins in her next five tournaments following the US Open, Vekić qualified for the second tier year-end singles tournament, the WTA Elite Trophy, for the first time in her career. Drawn in the Azalea Group with top seed Bertens and Dayana Yastremska, she fell in straight sets in both her matches, ending her season. Nonetheless, Vekić finished the year ranked world No. 19, her first year-end top 20 finish.

2020: Australian Open and US Open third round, out of top 20
Vekić kicked off her 2020 season at the Brisbane International. She lost in the first round to qualifier Yulia Putintseva. Playing at the first edition of the Adelaide International, Vekić reached the quarterfinal where she was defeated by eventual finalist, Dayana Yastremska.

Seeded 19th at the Australian Open, Vekić beat 2008 champion and former world No. 1, Maria Sharapova, in the first round, and Alizé Cornet in the second. She lost in the third round to Iga Świątek.

At the St. Petersburg Ladies' Trophy, Vekić, the seventh seed and the previous year's finalist, was defeated in the second round by Ekaterina Alexandrova. Seeded 17th at the Qatar Open, she lost in the first round to Iga Świątek.

2021: Major fourth round, Surgery, Olympics, Third title & back to top 70

Vekić started her 2021 season at the first edition of the Abu Dhabi Women's Open. Seeded 16th, she lost in the first round to Bernarda Pera. Seeded ninth at the first edition of the Yarra Valley Classic, she was defeated in the second round by Tsvetana Pironkova. Seeded 28th at the Australian Open, she achieved her best ever result by reaching the fourth round; she ended up being eliminated from the tournament by 22nd seed and eventual finalist, Jennifer Brady. With this run, she has reached the fourth round or better, completing the sweep of second-week appearances, at each of the four Grand Slam events. After the Australian Open, she underwent surgery on her right knee and said that she would be out of action for a while.
Vekić returned in time for the French Open but was beaten in the first round by ninth seed Karolína Plíšková.

Seeded third at the Nottingham Open, her first grass-court tournament of the season, Vekić lost in the third round to 15th seed Nina Stojanović. Seeded third in Birmingham, she reached quarterfinals and was defeated by Heather Watson. At Wimbledon, she was eliminated in the second round by eighth seed and eventual finalist, Karolína Plíšková.

Representing Croatia at the Summer Olympics, Vekić upset third seed Aryna Sabalenka in the second round. She was beaten in the third round by 15th seed and eventual semifinalist, Elena Rybakina.

Unable to defend her points from the 2019 US Open, Vekić fell out of the top 100 on 20 September 2021 to world No. 101, her lowest ranking in five years since year-end 2016. However, after winning her third WTA title at the Courmayeur Open in October, she returned to the top 70.

2022: Hiatus, second WTA 500 final, back to top 50

She took a two months hiatus between the Australian Open and before Rolland Garros returning to the WTA tour in April. Ranked No. 101, she qualified for 2022 French Open as the sixth qualifier seed. It was the first time Vekić has had to contest qualifying for a major since the 2016 US Open, due to injury and missing play between Australian Open and Roland Garros in 2021, leading to a dip in the rankings. After making the main draw at the French Open and a first-round win over Mirjam Björklund, she was defeated by Amanda Anisimova in the second round. At Wimbledon, Vekić lost in the first round to Jessica Pegula, in straight sets.

On 17 October 2022, she returned to the top 50 at world No. 47 for the first time since July 2021 after a final showing at the WTA 500 San Diego Open as a qualifier, defeating four straight top-25 players (including two in the top 10) en route before losing to Iga Świątek.

2023: First Australian Open quarterfinal, fourth WTA title, back to top 25

Vekić started her 2023 season at the 2023 United Cup, where she represented Croatia. She won all three of her matches in straight sets including a win over french player Alize Cornet. After the United Cup she entered the Australian Open ranked No. 64. There she defeated Oksana Selekhmeteva, 18th seed Liudmila Samsonova, Nuria Parrizas-Diaz and Linda Fruhvirtova to reach her first Australian Open quarterfinal. There she lost to the eventual champion, Aryna Sabalenka, in straight sets. As a result, she moved up 30 places in the rankings and re-entered the top 40 at world No. 33 on 30 January 2023.

Vekić won her fourth career title defeating top seed Caroline Garcia in three tight sets at the Abierto GNP Seguros in Monterrey, Mexico. The victory was her first Top 10 win of the season and first title since 2021. As a result, she returned to the top 25 on 6 March 2023.

Playing style

Vekić is an aggressive baseliner. She possesses a powerful first serve that is capable of producing aces, and has been recorded as high as 111 mph (178 km/h), but is somewhat inaccurate, meaning that she typically has first serve percentages between 50 and 60 percent. She makes up for this with a reliable second serve, so that double faults are uncommon. Her groundstrokes are powerful, allowing her to dictate play from the baseline, and her forehand, which is hit hard, flat, and fast, is her greatest asset. Due to her quick and aggressive style of play, she accumulates significant numbers of both winners and unforced errors. She is also a quick mover, with impressive speed and footwork. Due to her movement and stamina, Vekić is adept at counterpunching until she can create an opportunity to hit a winner; her increased success in recent years has been as a result of her altering her game style away from solely aggressive play, to constructing points more deliberately, and increasing her defensive skills. Vekić's fast and quick style of play is especially suited to fast hard and grass courts, where the vast majority of her success has taken place. Her major areas of weakness are that she is reluctant to come to the net, she is not as proficient on slower courts such as clay courts, and she struggles against aggressive all-court players who play with variety, such as Ashleigh Barty, Iga Świątek, and Anastasija Sevastova.

Off the court
Beyond tennis, Vekić established a luxury home fragrance brand, DNNA, in 2021, selling beeswax candles and reed diffusers. She announced that a proportion of all sales revenue will be donated towards bee conservation in her native Croatia.

Career statistics

Grand Slam performance timelines

Singles

Doubles

References

External links

 
 
 

1996 births
Living people
Sportspeople from Osijek
Croatian female tennis players
Croatian expatriate sportspeople in Monaco
21st-century Croatian women
Olympic tennis players of Croatia
Tennis players at the 2020 Summer Olympics